Dąbrówka  is a village in the administrative district of Gmina Buczek, within Łask County, Łódź Voivodeship, in central Poland.

References

Villages in Łask County